Hadoa longiopercula is a species of annual cicada in the genus Hadoa. It is native to the U.S. state of Arizona where it inhabits desert scrub. It has been found in the south eastern corner of the state near Alligator Junipers.

.

References

Hemiptera of North America
Insects described in 1926
Cryptotympanini